IFK Askersund is a sports club in Askersund, Sweden, established 1 February 1895. running soccer activity. The club has also scored bandy successes, playing nine seasons in the Swedish top division between 1945 and 1964/1965.

References

External links
IFK Askersund 

IFK Askersund
Defunct bandy clubs in Sweden
Football clubs in Örebro County
Association football clubs established in 1895
Bandy clubs established in 1895